The Wanzhou Sports Center is a sports venue in Wanzhou District, Chongqing, China, on the bank of the Yangtze River. It has a multi-purpose stadium with a seating capacity of 26,000, and a natatorium with 1,650 seats. Construction began in March 2010, and the center was opened in October 2012.

References

Multi-purpose stadiums in China
Buildings and structures in Chongqing
2012 establishments in China
Sports venues completed in 2012